Tera Jadoo Chal Gayaa, is a 2000 Indian romantic movie starring Abhishek Bachchan and Keerthi Reddy (in her Bollywood debut).

Plot
On a visit to scenic Agra, Pooja (Keerthi Reddy) meets with a renowned artist, Kabir (Abhishek Bachchan). Kabir is instantly attracted to Pooja, and thinks that Pooja is also attracted to him. But Pooja is only attracted by his talent. On her return, she meets with her boss Mr. Oberoi (Kader Khan) and his son, Raj Oberoi (Sanjay Suri), and she instantly falls in love with Raj. Mr. Oberoi is unhappy with Pooja coming in late to work frequently, and wants to terminate her employment. A fellow employee, Maggi (Johnny Lever) comes to rescue of Pooja, and tells Mr. Oberoi that Pooja has been engaged to Kabir, and shows some photographs that were taken during Pooja's visit to Agra. Pooja reluctantly goes along with this charade in order to keep her job. Kabir is encouraged to know that Pooja has announced her engagement with him.

Cast 
Abhishek Bachchan as Kabir Shrivastav
Keerthi Reddy as Pooja Sinha
Sanjay Suri as Raj Oberoi
Kader Khan as Mr. Oberoi
Paresh Rawal as Gaffoor Bhai
Johnny Lever as Maggie
Tiku Talsania as Ramesh Tolani
Farida Jalal as Pooja's Mother
Himani Shivpuri as Shyama Aapa, Gaffoor's Wife
Ghanashyam Nayak as baniya
Satya Vrat Mudgal as photographer Satya

Soundtrack
According to the Indian trade website Box Office India, with around 18,00,000 units sold, this film's soundtrack album was the year's tenth highest-selling.

References

External links 

Bollywood Hungama review

2000 films
2000s Hindi-language films